Depok Lama (Indonesian for Old Depok) at this period is one of region in the City of Depok. In other hand, Depok Lama is the region boundary between the City of Depok and Bogor Regency. Renold Joseph said, "at the Dutch periode, the majority of inhabitants in Depok Lama is those Twelve Family name that received inheritance from Cornelis Chastelein." Those Twelve Family are Bacas, Isakh, Jonathans, Jacob, Joseph, Loen, Laurens, Leander, Tholonse, Soedira, Samuel, and Zadokh. Now, one of those Twelve Family aren't have a man generation (patrilineal culture) that is Zadokh Family. Nowadays, Depok Lama still showing the existence, because those Twelve Family having the good sensitivity with those cultural values.

Nowadays Depok Lama area lies at the center of City of Depok.

75 percent of colonial buildings in Depok has been destroyed to build residences and commercial buildings. Therefore, Alqiz Lukman, Ghilman Assilmi, and Ide Nada Imandiharja created the Depok Lama Project website to preserve the history of Depok Lama digitally, which consists of audio recordings of interviews with Yayasan Lembaga Cornelis Chastelein (YLCC, Cornelis Chastelein Foundation), local elders, the descendants of Chastelein’s slaves, heritage experts, and historians as well as photographs.

References

External links
 Depok Lama Project

Depok
Geography of West Java
Culture of West Java
Historic districts